Ammon (Ammonite: 𐤏𐤌𐤍 ʻAmān;) was an ancient Semitic-speaking nation occupying the east of the Jordan River, between the torrent valleys of Arnon and Jabbok, in present-day Jordan. The chief city of the country was Rabbah or Rabbat Ammon, site of the modern city of Amman, Jordan's capital. Milcom and Molech are named in the Hebrew Bible as the gods of Ammon. The people of this kingdom are called "Children of Ammon" or "Ammonites".

History

The Ammonites occupied the northern Central Trans-Jordanian Plateau from the latter part of the second millennium BCE to at least the second century CE.

Ammon maintained its independence from the Neo-Assyrian Empire (10th to 7th centuries BCE) by paying tribute to the Assyrian kings at a time when that Empire raided or conquered nearby kingdoms. The Kurkh Monolith lists the Ammonite king Baasha ben Ruhubi's army as fighting alongside Ahab of Israel and Syrian allies against Shalmaneser III at the Battle of Qarqar in 853 BCE, possibly as vassals of Hadadezer, the Aramaean king of Damascus. In 734 BCE the Ammonite king Sanipu was a vassal of Tiglath-Pileser III of Assyria, and Sanipu's successor Pudu-ilu held the same position under Sennacherib and Esarhaddon. An Assyrian tribute-list exists from this period, showing that Ammon paid one-fifth as much tribute as Judah did.

Somewhat later, the Ammonite king Amminadab I was among the tributaries who suffered in the course of the great Arabian campaign of Assurbanipal. Other kings attested to in contemporary sources are Barachel (attested to in several contemporary seals) and Hissalel - Hissalel reigned about 620 BCE, and is mentioned in an inscription on a bronze bottle found at Tel Siran in present-day Amman, along with his son, King Amminadab II, who reigned around 600 BCE.

Archaeology and history indicate that Ammon flourished during the period of the Neo-Babylonian Empire (626 to 539 BCE). This contradicts the view, dominant for decades, that Transjordan was either destroyed by Nebuchadnezzar II, or suffered a rapid decline following Judah's destruction by that king. Newer evidence suggests that Ammon enjoyed continuity from the Neo-Babylonian to the Persian period of 550 to 330 BCE.

In accounts in the First Book of Maccabees, the Ammonites and their neighboring tribes are noted for having resisted the revival of Jewish power under Judas Maccabaeus in the period 167 to 160 BCE. The dynast Hyrcanus founded Qasr Al Abd, and was a descendant of the Seleucid Tobiad dynasty of Tobiah, whom Nehemiah mentions in the 5th century BCE as an Ammonite (ii. 19) from the east-Jordanian district.

The last notice of the Ammonites occurs in Justin Martyr's Dialogue with Trypho (§ 119), in the second century CE; Justin affirms that they were still a numerous people.

Biblical account
It is stated there that they descended from Ben-Ammi, a son of Lot with his younger daughter who plotted with her sister to intoxicate Lot and, in his inebriated state, have intercourse with him to become pregnant. Ben-Ammi literally means "son of my people". After the destruction of Sodom and Gomorrah, Lot's daughters' plot resulted in them conceiving and giving birth to Ammon and his half-brother, Moab. This narrative has traditionally been considered literal fact; but is now generally interpreted as recording a gross popular irony by which the Israelites expressed their loathing of the morality of the Moabites and Ammonites. It has been doubted, however, whether the Israelites would have directed such irony to Lot himself.

The Ammonites settled to the east of the Jordan, invading the Rephaim lands east of Jordan, between the Jabbok and Arnon, dispossessing them and dwelling in their place. Their territory originally comprising all from the Jordan to the wilderness, and from the River Jabbok south to the River Arnon. It was accounted a land of giants; and that giants formerly dwelt in it, whom the Ammonites called Zamzummim.

Shortly before the Israelite Exodus, the Amorites west of Jordan, under King Sihon, invaded and occupied a large portion of the territory of Moab and Ammon. The Ammonites were driven from the rich lands near the Jordan and retreated to the mountains and valleys to the east. The invasion of the Amorites created a wedge and separated the two kingdoms of Ammon and Moab.

Throughout the Bible, the Ammonites and the Israelites are portrayed as mutual antagonists. During the Exodus, the Israelites were prohibited by the Ammonites from passing through their lands. The Ammonites soon allied themselves with Eglon of Moab in attacking Israel.

The Ammonites maintained their claim to part of Transjordan, after it was occupied by the Israelites who obtained it from Sihon. During the days of Jephthah, the Ammonites occupied the lands east of the River Jordan and started to invade Israelite lands west of the river. Jephthah became the leader in resisting these incursions.

The constant harassment of the Israelite communities east of the Jordan by the Ammonites was the impetus behind the unification of the tribes under Saul. King Nahash of Ammon (990 BC) lay siege to Jabesh-Gilead. Nahash appears abruptly as the attacker of Jabesh-Gilead, which lay outside the territory he laid claim to. Having subjected the occupants to a siege, the population sought terms for surrender, and were told by Nahash that they had a choice of death (by the sword) or having their right eyes gouged out. The population obtained seven days' grace from Nahash, during which they would be allowed to seek help from the Israelites, after which they would have to submit to the terms of surrender. The occupants sought help from the people of Israel, sending messengers throughout the whole territory, and Saul, a herdsman at this time, responded by raising an army which decisively defeated Nahash and his cohorts at Bezek.

The strangely cruel terms given by Nahash for surrender were explained by Josephus as being the usual practice of Nahash. A more complete explanation came to light with the discovery of the Dead Sea Scrolls: although not present in either the Septuagint or masoretic text, an introductory passage, preceding this narrative, was found in a copy of the Books of Samuel among the scrolls found in cave 4:

This eventually led to an alliance with Saul. Under his command, the Israelites relieved the siege and defeated the Ammonite king, eventually resulting in the formation of the Israelite kingdom.

During the reign of King David, the Ammonites humiliated David's messengers, and hired the Aramean armies to attack Israel. This eventually ended in a war and a year-long siege of Rabbah, the capital of Ammon. The war ended with all the Ammonite cities being conquered and plundered, and the inhabitants being killed or put to forced labor at David's command.

She was the only wife of King Solomon to be mentioned by name in the Tanakh as having borne a child. She was the mother of Solomon's successor, Rehoboam.

When the Arameans of Damascus city-state deprived the Kingdom of Israel of their possessions east of the Jordan, the Ammonites became allies of Ben-hadad, and a contingent of 1,000 of them served as allies of Syria in the great battle of the Arameans and Assyrians at Qarqar in 854 BC in the reign of Shalmaneser III.

The Ammonites, Moabites and Meunim formed a coalition against Jehoshaphat of Judah. The coalition later was thrown to confusion, with the armies slaughtering one another. They were subdued and paid tribute to Jotham.

After submitting to Tiglath-Pileser III they were generally tributary to the Neo-Assyrian Empire, but had joined in the general uprising that took place under Sennacherib; but they submitted and they became tributary in the reign of Esar-haddon. Their hostility to Judah is shown in their joining the Chaldeans to destroy it. Their cruelty is denounced by the prophet Amos and their destruction (with their return in the future) by Jeremiah; Ezekiel; and Zephaniah. Their murder of Gedaliah was a dastardly act. They may have regained their old territory when Tiglath-pileser carried off the Israelites east of the Jordan into captivity.

Tobiah the Ammonite united with Sanballat to oppose Nehemiah, and their opposition to the Jews did not cease with the establishment of the latter in Judea.

The Ammonites presented a serious problem to the Pharisees because many marriages between Israelite men and Ammonite (and Moabite) women had taken place in the days of Nehemiah. The men had married women of the various nations without conversion, which made the children not Jewish. They also joined the Syrians in their wars with the Maccabees and were defeated by Judas. The "sons of Ammon" would be subject to Israel during the time of the Messiah's rulership according to the prophet Isaiah. The book of Zephaniah states that "Moab will assuredly be like Sodom, and the sons of Ammon like Gomorrah—Ground overgrown with weeds and full of salt mines, and a permanent desolation.".

Rabbinic literature
The Ammonites, still numerous in the south of Palestine in the second Christian century according to Justin Martyr, presented a serious problem to the Pharisaic scribes because many marriages with Ammonite and Moabite wives had taken place in the days of Nehemiah. Still later, it is not improbable that when Judas Maccabeus had inflicted a crushing defeat upon the Ammonites, Jewish warriors took Ammonite women as wives, and their sons, sword in hand, claimed recognition as Jews notwithstanding the law that "an Ammonite or a Moabite shall not enter into the congregation of the Lord." Such a condition or a similar incident is reflected in the story told in the Talmud that in the days of King Saul, the legitimacy of David's claim to royalty was disputed on account of his descent from Ruth, the Moabite; whereupon Ithra, the Israelite, girt with his sword, strode like an Ishmaelite into the schoolhouse of Jesse, declaring upon the authority of Samuel, the prophet, and his bet din (court of justice), that the law excluding the Ammonite and Moabite from the Jewish congregation referred only to the men—who alone had sinned in not meeting Israel with bread and water—and not to the women. The story reflects actual conditions in pre-Talmudic times, conditions that led to the fixed rule stated in the Mishnah: "Ammonite and Moabite men are excluded from the Jewish community for all time; their women are admissible."

That Rehoboam, the son of King Solomon, was born of an Ammonite woman also made it difficult to maintain the Messianic claims of the house of David; but it was adduced as an illustration of divine Providence which selected the "two doves," Ruth, the Moabite, and Naamah, the Ammonitess, for honorable distinction. Ruth's kindness as noted in the Book of Ruth by Boaz is seen in the Jewish Tradition as in rare contradistinction to the peoples of Moab (where Ruth comes from) and Amon in general, who were noted by the Torah for their distinct lack of kindness. Deut. 23:5: "Because they [the peoples of Amon and Moab] did not greet you with bread and water on the way when you left Egypt, and because he [the people of Moab] hired Balaam the son of Beor from Pethor in Aram Naharaim against you, to curse you." Rashi notes regarding Israel's travels on the way: "when you were in [a state of] extreme exhaustion."

Jehoash was one of the four men who pretended to be gods. He was persuaded thereto particularly by the princes, who said to him. "Wert thou not a god thou couldst not come out alive from the Holy of Holies" (Ex R. viii. 3). He was assassinated by two of his servants, one of whom was the son of an Ammonite woman and the other the offspring of a Moabite; for God said: "Let the descendants of the two ungrateful families chastise the ungrateful Joash" (Yalk., Ex. 262).

Baalis, king of the Ammonites, envious of the Jewish colony's prosperity, or jealous of the might of the Babylonian king, instigated Ishmael, son of Nathaniel, "of the royal seed," to make an end of the Judean rule in Palestine, Ishmael, being an unscrupulous character, permitted himself to become the tool of the Ammonite king in order to realize his own ambition to become the ruler of the deserted land. Information of this conspiracy reached Gedaliah through Johanan, son of Kareah, and Johanan undertook to slay Ishmael before he had had time to carry out his evil design; but the governor disbelieved the report, and forbade Johanan to lay hands upon the conspirator. Ishmael and his ten companions were royally entertained at Gedaliah's table. In the midst of the festivities Ishmael slew the unsuspecting Gedaliah, the Chaldean garrison stationed in Mizpah, and all the Jews that were with him, casting their bodies into the pit of Asa (Josephus, "Ant." x. 9, § 4). The Rabbis condemn the overconfidence of Gedaliah, holding him responsible for the death of his followers (Niddah 61a; comp. Jer. xli. 9). Ishmael captured many of the inhabitants of Mizpah, as well as "the daughters of the king" entrusted to Gedaliah's care by the Babylonian general, and fled to Ammon. Johanan and his followers, however, on receiving the sad tidings, immediately pursued the murderers, overtaking them at the lake of Gibeon. The captives were rescued, but Ishmael and eight of his men escaped to the land of Ammon. The plan of Baalis thus succeeded, for the Jewish refugees, fearing lest the Babylonian king should hold them responsible for the murder, never returned to their native land. In spite of the exhortations of Jeremiah they fled to Egypt, joined by the remnant of the Jews that had survived, together with Jeremiah and Baruch (Jer. xliii. 6). The rule of Gedaliah lasted, according to tradition, only two months, although Grätz argues that it continued more than four years.

Language

The few Ammonite names that have been preserved also include Nahash and Hanun, both from the Bible. The Ammonites' language is believed to be in the Canaanite family, closely related to Hebrew and Moabite. Ammonite may have incorporated certain Aramaic influences, including the use of bd, instead of commoner Biblical Hebrew śh, for "work". The only other notable difference with Biblical Hebrew is the sporadic retention of feminine singular -t (e.g., šħt "cistern", but lyh "high (fem.)".)

Inscriptions
Inscriptions found in the Ammonite language include an inscription on a bronze bottle dating to c. 600 BC and the Amman Citadel Inscription.

Religion
Sources for what little is known of Ammonite religion are mostly the Hebrew Bible and material evidence. In general it appears to have been rather typical for Levantine religions, with Milkom, El and the moon god being the most prominent deities.

Economy
The economy, for the most part, was based on agriculture and herding. Most people lived in small villages surrounded by farms and pastures. Like its sister-kingdom of Moab, Ammon was the source of numerous natural resources, including sandstone and limestone. It had a productive agricultural sector and occupied a vital place along the King's Highway, the ancient trade route connecting Egypt with Mesopotamia, Syria, and Asia Minor. As with the Edomites and Moabites, trade along this route gave them considerable revenue. Circa 950 BCE Ammon showed rising prosperity, due to agriculture and trade, and built a series of fortresses. Its capital was located in what is now the Citadel of Amman.

See also
 List of rulers of Ammon
 Abel-cheramim
 Ammon as a name used in the Book of Mormon
 Ammon (Book of Mormon explorer)
 Ammon (Book of Mormon missionary)

References

Bibliography

External links

 Hertz J.H. (1936) The Pentateuch and Haftoras. "Deuteronomy." Oxford University Press, London.
 Ammon on Bruce Gordon's Regnal Chronologies (also at )

 
Ancient history of Jordan
Ancient Israel and Judah
Semitic-speaking peoples
Vayeira
States and territories established in the 10th century BC
States and territories disestablished in the 4th century BC
Former monarchies of Asia